Synaphobranchus dolichorhynchus is an eel in the family Synaphobranchidae (cutthroat eels). It was described by Einar Hagbart Martin Lea in 1913, originally under the genus Leptocephalus. It is a marine, subtropical eel which is known solely from larval specimens discovered in the northern Atlantic Ocean.

References

Synaphobranchidae
Fish described in 1913